The Canon TLb is a 35 mm single-lens reflex camera introduced by Canon in September 1974.  It features a Canon FD lens mount, and is also compatible with Canon's earlier FL-mount lenses in stop-down metering mode.  The TLb was a cheaper version of the Canon FTb for the export market, as was the slightly later TX.  Compared to the TX, the hot shoe was omitted, although the camera included a PC terminal for flash sync.  The TLb was later (April 1976) sold in Japan.

References

External links

FZ TLb